David Albert Hollinger (born April 25, 1941 in Chicago, Illinois) is the Preston Hotchkis Professor of History, emeritus at the University of California, Berkeley. His specialties are American intellectual history and American ethnoracial history.

In 2022 Hollinger published Christianity’s American Fate: How Religion Became More Conservative and Society More Secular (Princeton University Press). The most well known of his eight previous books are Postethnic America: Beyond Multiculturalism (1995), Science, Jews, and Secular Culture (1996), After Cloven Tongues of Fire: Protestant Liberalism and Modern American History (2013), and Protestants Abroad: How Missionaries Tried to Change the World but Changed America (2017). He has edited or co-edited several other books, including The American Intellectual Tradition (seven editions, 1989 to 2016), co-edited with Charles Capper, Reappraising Oppenheimer (2005) co-edited with Cathryn Carson. And The Humanities and the Dynamics of Inclusion (2006).  One of his articles has become a standard treatment of the process of racialization and ethnoracial mixture, “Amalgamation and Hypodescent: The Question of Ethnoracial Mixture in the History of the United States,” American Historical Review, 2003.

His influence in the field of religious history was featured in 2013 in The New York Times.

Life 
Hollinger grew up in the Church of the Brethren, a denomination in which his father, grandfather, and great-grandfather had been ministers, but Hollinger has identified himself as an atheist for most of his adult life. His family memoir, When This Mask of Flesh is Broken: The Story of an American Protestant Family (2017) is account of the Hollinger family’s history and its role in the Brethren community.

Hollinger earned his Bachelor of Arts degree from La Verne College in 1963 his Master of Arts degree in 1965 and his Ph.D. in 1970, both from University of California, Berkeley. Before joining the Berkeley faculty himself in 1992, Hollinger taught at the University at Buffalo and the University of Michigan. He served as Harmsworth Professor of American History at Oxford University in 2001-2. He retired at Berkeley in 2013.

Since 1967 he has been married to legal scholar Joan Heifetz Hollinger. He is the father of two children.

Hollinger has served as the Ph.D. advisor to people who have since become well established as publishing scholars in history, including Mark Pittenger (at the University of Michigan), and at UC Berkeley: S. M. Amadae, Jennifer Burns, Ruben Flores, K. Healan Gaston, Daniel Geary, Nils Gilman, Daniel Immerwahr, Andrew Jewett, Susan Nance, Molly Oshatz, Kevin Schultz, Jonathan Spiro, and Gene Zubovich.

Hollinger served as president of the Organization of American Historians in 2010-11. He is an elected fellow of The American Academy of Arts and Sciences. He has served as a trustee of the National Humanities Center and of the Institute For Advanced Study. is He is an elected member of the American Philosophical Society.

Works
 Hollinger, David A.; Capper, Charles (1989). The American Intellectual Tradition: A Sourcebook. 1620-1865. Oxford University Press. .
 Hollinger, David A. (April 1989). In the American Province: Studies in the History and Historiography of Ideas. JHU Press. .
 Hollinger, David A. (2006-02-28). Postethnic America: Beyond Multiculturalism. Basic Books. .
 Hollinger, David A. (2006-03-06). Cosmopolitanism and Solidarity: Studies in Ethnoracial, Religious, and Professional Affiliation in the United States. Univ of Wisconsin Press. .
 Hollinger, David A. (2013-04-21). After Cloven Tongues of Fire: Protestant Liberalism in Modern American History. Princeton University Press. .
 Hollinger, David A. (2017-10-17). Protestants Abroad: How Missionaries Tried to Change the World But Changed America. Princeton University Press. 
 Hollinger, David A. (2017). When this Mask of Flesh is Broken: The Story of an American Protestant Family]. Outskirts Press. .
 Hollinger, David A (2022) Christianity’s American Fate: How Religion Became More Conservative and Society More Secular. Princeton University Press. ISBN 9780691233888

Presentations and Panels

Christianity’s American Fate: How Religion Became More Conservative and Society More Secular (Princeton University, Wilson Center, Oct. 17, 2022)
Race in the Age of Obama, American Academy of Arts & Sciences, St. Louis, MO (2012)
Kuhn, the Quotidian, and the Question of God's Death,Center for Science, Technology, Medicine & Society at the University of California, Berkeley (2013)

References

External links
 U.C. Berkeley faculty page
 http://www.chronicle.com/article/Why-Cant-the-Sciencesthe/142239

Living people
University of California, Berkeley alumni
University of California, Berkeley College of Letters and Science faculty
21st-century American historians
21st-century American male writers
Fellows of the American Academy of Arts and Sciences
Trustees of the Institute for Advanced Study
1941 births
Harold Vyvyan Harmsworth Professors of American History
University of Michigan faculty
University of La Verne alumni
University at Buffalo faculty
Historians from California
American male non-fiction writers